Her Private Hell is a 1968 British sexploitation film. It is the feature film directorial debut of Norman J. Warren and the first of two films (the second being Loving Feeling) that he made for Bachoo Sen and Richard Schulman, founders of production company Piccadilly Pictures. It has been described as "Britain's first narrative sex film".

Plot
A young Italian woman called Marisa (Lucia Modugno) arrives in London to model for a magazine owned by Neville and Margaret (Robert Crewdson and Pearl Catlin). She is sent to live in an ultramodern flat belonging to Bernie (Terry Skelton), the magazine's top photographer – ostensibly for her safety, but in reality to prevent her from being poached by rival publications. Though surrounded by luxury, Marisa comes to realise that her employers control nearly every aspect of her life. She begins a sexual relationship with Bernie but quickly learns that she is not the first model he has seduced.

Although Marisa is only willing to pose semi-clothed, Neville wants the magazine to show full nudity. Matt (Daniel Ollier) – a younger, up-and-coming photographer – urges Marisa to leave, claiming that Neville, Margaret and Bernie see her as nothing more than a "money-making machine". Later, Matt drives Marisa to the countryside for an avant-garde photoshoot in which Marisa freely poses nude. Marisa becomes romantically involved with Matt, creating a love triangle with him and Bernie.

Matt's photos end up in Margaret's possession. Later, to Marisa's torment, they are published in a foreign magazine. Margaret, Matt and Bernie all deny selling the photos. Matt is disturbed by the leak and wants to take Marisa away. He confronts Neville, who offers him his own studio if he drops the matter. Meanwhile, Marisa is determined to leave with Bernie, but has a change of heart when Matt denounces Margaret and Bernie to their faces, telling them that "integrity and self-respect are more important than money." Matt and Marisa drive away together. Bernie comforts a tearful Margaret, assuring her that "there'll be others." The final scene reveals that Bernie and Margaret are married, that Margaret condones Bernie's affairs and that no one ever told Marisa she was sleeping with Margaret's husband.

Cast
 Lucia Modugno as Marisa
 Terry Skelton as Bernie
 Pearl Catlin as Margaret
 Daniel Ollier as Matt
 Jeanette Wild as Paula
 Mary Land as Sally
 Robert Crewdson as Neville

Themes
Josephine Botting of the British Film Institute (BFI) has commented on the film's impression of isolation (particularly on the part of the naive Marisa) and the distrust that it creates among the characters: "In Her Private Hell, suspicion springs from a sense of the characters' remoteness from each other, both literal and metaphorical. The use of location adds to the feeling – characters enter and leave Bernie's flat with no indication of where they've been or where they're going ..."

Botting and David McGillivray also identify a theme of power and manipulation, noting that Margaret and Bernie use sex to control others. Both characterise the couple's open-minded attitude to adultery as the embracement of a swinging lifestyle. McGillivray describes this as an "early reference to sexual behaviour that was to become a popular theme in exploitation movies of the early 1970s". He compares the film's "corruption-of-the-innocent" premise to the plots of 1930s American melodramas such as Reefer Madness (1936).

Production
According to Warren, producer Bachoo Sen had approached Richard Schulman, owner of London's Paris Pullman Cinema, with a proposal to set up a film production partnership. At the time of the meeting, Schulman was screening Warren's short film Fragment. As Sen and Schulman were lacking a director, Sen contacted Warren with an offer to make two films for them, which Warren accepted. In Warren's own words, "I had no idea what the film would be, but to be honest, I would have said yes to anything. I was 25 and desperate to direct a feature film."

Her Private Hell was written by Glynn Christian, a New Zealand immigrant who based the story on his own experiences as a foreigner living in 1960s London. The film was shot in two weeks on a budget of £18,000 (approximately £ in ). Filming was conducted at London's Isleworth Studios alongside the biopic Isadora, as well as on location in Hampstead. To lower production costs, Warren edited the film himself.

Tony Britton and Peter Reynolds were considered for roles in the film. Udo Kier auditioned for the part of Matt but lost to French actor Daniel Ollier. Due to Ollier's thick accent, the character's lines were dubbed by another actor. Italian actress Lucia Modugno knew little English at the time of production. Botting speculates that Sen cast Modugno and Ollier to appeal to continental European audiences.

Release and reception
According to Barry Forshaw, Her Private Hell was "considered very strong stuff in 1967." By order of the British Board of Film Censors, several scenes of nudity were cut prior to release. The film ran as one half of a double bill with French feature Les Vierges (1963). One London cinema showed the film for two years.

Warren described Her Private Hell as "not a great film", but added that it "[made] a lot of money at the box office and that was very good for my reputation."

Critical response
In a contemporary review, The Monthly Film Bulletin was dismissive of the film, calling it "embarrassingly self-conscious" and criticising what it regarded as a weak story with poorly-developed characters and a lack of excitement.

Botting states that while the story "may seem a little far-fetched", the film overall "manages to be more than just a 'dull tit-and-bum parade'," commenting that its cast and direction "[raise it] above its genre and limitations." She also states that it "wisely eschews" the existentialism of Michelangelo Antonioni's Blowup (1966), a mystery thriller with a comparable premise.

McGillivray calls Her Private Hell a "fine example of British independent exploitation cinema" but argues that Ollier's character may qualify as "the screen's dullest love interest". He suggests that various aspects of the film, including its title sequence, were unwittingly influenced by the French New Wave, while the suspenseful scenes of Marisa's arrival at Bernie's flat give "a foretaste of the horror director Warren was to become". Drawing comparisons with European art cinema, Sam Dunn of the BFI notes that the scenes of Marisa's pick-up from the airport are without music or audible dialogue, creating a "distinctly un-British" feel. He believes that Her Private Hell "lacks the subtlety and emotional complexity" of Warren's short films. Forshaw considers Modugno to be "palpably not equal to the histrionic demands the director makes of her; her talents lay elsewhere."

Writing for review website The Spinning Image, Graeme Clark describes the film as "not exactly a riveting melodrama", also commenting that although the "private hell" of the title presumably refers to Marisa's humiliation, "if anything it's a public hell." Anthony Nield of The Digital Fix describes the "generic" plot as "without doubt the least interesting thing" about the film. He considers Her Private Hell to be influenced by "arthouse sensibilities" but still "a slice of exploitation cinema ... the film is always fighting that tension between quality and trash." However, he adds that the cast's "solid, if rarely remarkable" performances "elevate the characters above the 'sexploitation' norm" and that despite being "flawed", the film manages to maintain the audience's interest. Nield also states that along with Warren's earlier short films Incident (1959) and Fragment (1966), Her Private Hell "reveals a side of Warren rarely glimpsed: that of the sensitive director, one who was in thrall to François Truffaut and particularly adept at handling female performances."

References

External links

Trailer on the BFI's YouTube channel

1960s British films
1960s English-language films
1960s erotic films
1960s exploitation films
1968 films
1968 independent films
British black-and-white films
British independent films
British sexploitation films
Films about adultery in the United Kingdom
Films about modeling
Films directed by Norman J. Warren
Films scored by John Scott (composer)
Films set in London
Films shot at Isleworth Studios
Films shot in London